Keogh (usually pronounced  ) is an Irish surname. The personal name  is in turn based upon the Gaelic word for horse (Old Irish ).
The spelling K'Eogh is used by one particular family, late of Kilbride House, County Carlow.

People
 Sir Alfred Keogh, British Army medical doctor 
 Andrew Keogh (librarian), British-born American librarian
 Andy Keogh, Irish football player
 Barbara Keogh, British actress 
 Sir Bruce Keogh, British professor of cardiac surgery
 David John Keogh, Scottish football player
 Doreen Keogh (1926–2017), Irish-born actress
 Edward Keogh, Wisconsin politician

 Esmond Venner Keogh, Australian Army officer and medical scientist

 Eugene James Keogh, New York politician

 Eustace Graham Keogh, Australian Army officer and military historian
 Fenton Keogh, Australian celebrity chef
 Helen Keogh, Irish politician
 Henry Keogh, Australian murderer
 James Keogh (disambiguation)
 John Keogh (disambiguation)
 Kerrie Ann Keogh, singer
 Liam Keogh, Scottish football player
 Matt Keough, American pro baseball player, mostly for the Oakland Athletics
 Michael Keogh (disambiguation)
 Myles Keogh, Irish soldier and American Civil War (Union) military officer
 Nina Keogh, Canadian puppet builder
 Patrick Keogh, New Zealand Rugby Union player
 Richard Keogh, Irish football player
 Simon Keogh, Irish rugby player
 Theodora Keogh, an American novelist
 Thomas Keogh, Bishop of Kildare and Leighlin
 Tom Keogh, illustrator
 Trevor Keogh, Australian football player
 William Keogh, Irish politician and judge

See also 
Kehoe (surname)
Keoghan (surname)
Keohane (disambiguation)
Keough (surname)
McKeogh
McKeough (disambiguation)

References

Anglicised Irish-language surnames
Anglicised Scottish Gaelic-language surnames
Scottish surnames